Air Marshal Navkaranjit Singh Dhillon, AVSM was the commander-in-chief of India's Strategic Forces Command. He assumed office on April 1, 2019, following the retirement of Air Marshal Jasbir Walia. He superannuated on 31 January 2021.

Early life and education
Dhillon is an alumnus of St. Francis School, Amritsar, Sainik School, Kapurthala and Khalsa College, Amritsar. He is a graduate of the National Defence Academy, Khadakwasla, Defence Services Staff College, Wellington and the National Defence College, New Delhi.

Career
Dhillon has served as Principal Director Air Defence at Air Headquarters (Vayu Bhawan), as well as Assistant Chief of Air Staff (Inspection) at Air Headquarters. Prior to assuming commander-in-chief of Strategic Forces Command, he was Air Defence Commander at Headquarters, Southern Air Command and Senior Air Staff Officer at Headquarters, Western Air Command.

Honours and decorations
In his career of 38 years, Dhillon has been awarded Ati Vishisht Seva Medal in 2014 and the Param Vishisht Seva Medal in 2021 for his service.

Personal life
He is married to Simmar Dhillon and they have a son Pavit Dhillon and a Daughter Puneet Dhillon.

References

Living people
Indian Air Force air marshals
National Defence Academy (India) alumni
1961 births
National Defence College, India alumni
Recipients of the Ati Vishisht Seva Medal
Defence Services Staff College alumni